Milorad Pavlović — Krpa (Belgrade, 4 October 1865 — Belgrade, 29 January 1957) was a Serbian writer, publicist, translator, and editor and publisher of Glasnik za zabavu i nauku (Entertainment and Science Herald).

While studying abroad, in Germany, his interest in the work of Anton Chekhov and Afanasy Fet led him to study the Russian language and try his hand in translating. He eventually translated several of Chekhov's short stories and novellas, entitled Čehovjevih Pripovedaka and Ruski ljudi (both published in 1890) and Fet's poetry. He also authored several books, including a memoir that appeared in 1963 in Belgrade's  newspaper Politika entitled "A Witness to an Era."

Works
 Slika i karakteri iz srpskoga društva (Picture and Characters from Serbian Orgnaizations);
 Napuljska šetnja (Neapoletan Walks), 1911;
 Prica iz života kralja Petra (Stoies from King Peter's Life), 1922;
 Kralj Aleksandar I Karađorđević u ratu i Mir (King Alexander I Karadjordjević in War and Peace);
 Sunćana Prašina (Sunny Dust), 1941-1944;
 Svedok jednog stoleća (A Witness to an Era), 1963
 Stevan Sremac (1936)
 Unique item: delta novel with a hundred endings Tvorci Srbije i Jugoslavije: Radovi Archdjakona Lukijana Bibića akademskog slikara (1941)
 Naš u ratu (1928)
 Anegdote iz života naših književnika i umetnika'' (1953).

References 

1865 births
1957 deaths
Writers from Belgrade
20th-century Serbian writers
21st-century Serbian writers